Blues for Sarka is a live album by the New York Jazz Quartet which was recorded in 1978 and released on the Enja label.

Reception 

AllMusic awarded the album 4½ stars and reviewer Ken Dryden called it: "easily one of the best releases by The New York Jazz Quartet".

Track listing 
All compositions by Roland Hanna except as indicated
 "All Blues" (Miles Davis) – 15:29
 "Rodney Round Robin" – 5:44
 "I'll Tell You Tonite" (George Mraz) – 7:14
 "Blues for Sarka" (Mraz) – 7:11
 "Smelly Jelly Belly" – 9:33

Personnel 
Frank Wess – flute, tenor saxophone
Roland Hanna – piano
George Mraz  – bass
Grady Tate – drums

References 

New York Jazz Quartet albums
1978 albums
Enja Records albums